Hotel Roberts may refer to:

 Hotel Roberts (Pratt, Kansas), listed on the National Register of Historic Places (NRHP)
 Hotel Roberts (Provo, Utah), a former hotel, previously listed on the NRHP

See also
 Roberts Hotel,  Muncie, Indiana, listed on the NRHP